Elizabeth Clare McLaren-Throckmorton (née d'Abreu; 18 August 1935 – 31 October 2017), known professionally as Clare Tritton, QC, was a British barrister and descendant of the Throckmorton baronets. She was the tenant of the Throckmorton family's main residence, Coughton Court near Alcester in Warwickshire, England, now owned by the National Trust. She was also the owner of the Molland Estate in North Devon.

Personal life
Clare McLaren-Throckmorton was born as Elizabeth Clare d'Abreu, one of three daughters, of Professor Alphonsus Ligouri d'Abreu (CBE, FRCS), a surgeon, and the former Elizabeth Ursula Arienwen Throckmorton. She has two younger sisters, Felicity and Veronica.

Felicity Ann d'Abreu (b. 12 December 1938), the middle sister, married, firstly, Charles Reginald Hugh Crosland, in 1959; they have three daughters. Her first marriage dissolved, Felicity Crosland married, secondly, the British writer Roald Dahl (22 years her senior) in 1983. Dahl died seven years later.

Veronica Teresa d'Abreu (b. 10 July 1948), the youngest of the d'Abreu sisters, married Marius Peregrine Lechmere Barran in 1972; they have four daughters.

Marriages
Clare McLaren-Throckmorton's first marriage was to Alan George Tritton, CBE, DL, of Lyons Hall, Great Leighs, Chelmsford, Essex, formerly director of Barclays Bank, High Sheriff of Essex 1992, CBE June 1999 for services to Anglo-Indial relations & preservation of the cultural heritage. They had the following three children: Christina Margaret Tritton (born 1960), Robert Guy Henton Tritton (born 1963), and Charles Courtenay Tritton (born 1965). That marriage was dissolved.

Another marriage of hers was to John Andrew McLaren (born 2 July 1932 – died 6 January 2007). In order to preserve the Throckmorton family name, she became Mrs. McLaren-Throckmorton.

Throckmorton Baronets
The Throckmorton family were infamous in England for their part in the Throckmorton Plot of 1583 which aimed to murder Elizabeth I and replace her with Mary Stuart.  They were also "indirectly" involved in the Gunpowder Plot of 1605 through their association with Robert Catesby. 

McLaren-Throckmorton is a member of the Throckmorton family via her mother, Elizabeth, the sister of Sir Robert Throckmorton, 11th Baronet. The 10th Baronet, Sir Richard Throckmorton, was her great-grandfather. The 12th and last Baronet, Sir Anthony Throckmorton, died in 1994; thus the title is now extinct.

Professional life
Clare McLaren-Throckmorton trained as a barrister and specialised in European Community Law with a particular interest in competition law. She served on the Monopolies and Mergers Commission and on the Financial Intermediaries, Managers and Brokers Regulatory Association (FIMBRA). She relinquished her non-executive directorship of the Birmingham Royal Ballet Trust Company.

She was a non-executive director of Severn Trent Water, and was also a Trustee Director of some of the company's pension schemes. Furthermore, she was the Chief Executive of Throckmorton Estates, the organisation which controls the Throckmorton family's assets, including the Molland Estate in North Devon. This does not include Coughton Court which is owned by The National Trust although the grounds are managed by Throckmorton Estates.

She died surrounded by her family 31 October 2017 at the age of 82.

References

1935 births
2017 deaths
British barristers
People from Alcester
20th-century King's Counsel
People educated at St Leonards-Mayfield School